Curtis Weaver (born August 3, 1998) is an American football outside linebacker for the Minnesota Vikings of the National Football League (NFL). He played college football at Boise State.

Early years
Weaver attended St. Anthony High School in Long Beach, California. He committed to Boise State University to play college football.

College career
After redshirting his first year at Boise State in 2016, Weaver played in all 14 games in 2017, recording 33 tackles, 11 sacks and one interception. As a redshirt sophomore in 2018, he had 43 tackles and 9.5 sacks. During his redshirt junior year in 2019, he set the Mountain West Conference record for career sacks.  After this season, Weaver announced that he would forgo his final year of eligibility and enter the 2020 NFL Draft.

Professional career

Miami Dolphins
Weaver was drafted by the Miami Dolphins in the fifth round (164th overall) of the 2020 NFL Draft. He was waived/injured by the team on August 24, 2020.

Cleveland Browns
Weaver was claimed off waivers by the Cleveland Browns on August 25, 2020. The Browns placed Weaver on injured reserve on August 27, 2020.

Weaver was waived by the Browns on August 31, 2021. Weaver was re-signed to the Browns' practice squad on September 1, 2021. Weaver was elevated to the Browns' active roster as a COVID-19 replacement player on December 24, 2021. Weaver made his NFL debut on January 9, 2022 against the Cincinnati Bengals, logging a tackle in the 21-16 victory. The Browns re-signed Weaver to a reserve/futures contract on January 10, 2022. He was waived by the Browns on August 29, 2022. He was re-signed to the practice squad on September 27, 2022. He was released on October 4, 2022.

Minnesota Vikings
On January 18, 2023, Weaver signed a reserve/future contract with the Minnesota Vikings.

References

External links
Boise State Broncos bio

1998 births
Living people
Players of American football from Long Beach, California
American football defensive ends
American football linebackers
Boise State Broncos football players
Miami Dolphins players
Cleveland Browns players
All-American college football players
Minnesota Vikings players